Äijälä is a Finnish surname. Notable people with the surname include:

Ilari Äijälä (born 1986), Finnish footballer
Jussi Äijälä (born 1988), Finnish footballer
Läjä Äijälä (born 1958), Finnish musician, comics artist and poet

Finnish-language surnames